Mike Andrew DuHaime (born May 1974), a Republican strategist and public affairs executive, is a managing director at Mercury Public Affairs, LLC, a national public affairs firm. He was the chief strategist for the successful campaign of former U.S. Attorney Chris Christie for Governor of New Jersey in 2009. Christie unseated the incumbent, Democrat Jon Corzine, by nearly 87,000 votes (48.5% of the popular vote). He served as one of ten members of Gov. Christie's transition team and was the chairman of the authorities subcommittee.

He managed Rudy Giuliani's campaign for the 2008 Republican presidential nomination. He has served as Political Director of the Republican National Committee, as Regional Political Director of President Bush's 2004 re-election campaign, and as Executive Director of the New Jersey Republican State Committee.

DuHaime served as Political Director of the Republican National Committee from January 2005 to December 2006, where he became known for his ability to effectively organize on the grassroots level. He is a protégé of Republican National Chairman Ken Mehlman, and Terry Nelson.

As a Regional Political Director for Bush-Cheney presidential campaign in 2004, DuHaime helped develop the national "get out the vote" and Election Day efforts and directed the day-to-day campaign operations in 11 northeastern states, which yielded millions more votes for the President in the region and kept John Kerry tied up in his Northeastern base.

Prior to working on the Bush campaign, DuHaime worked for Republicans at the local, state, and federal level.

DuHaime advised the 2016 Chris Christie presidential campaign.

Family

DuHaime was born in 1973 and grew up in Bloomingdale, New Jersey.

His father, Richard DuHaime, a conservative Republican, was a four-term Passaic County Freeholder and ran for the U.S. Senate in 1996. He finished second in a three-way Republican primary, only capturing 20% of the vote and losing to Rep. Richard Zimmer. In Passaic County, he won nearly 78% of the vote.

His mother, Anne DuHaime, served as the Mayor of Bloomingdale.  His sister, Debbie DuHaime, is the morning traffic reporter for WABC radio in New York City and appears on the Imus in the Morning program.

Michael DuHaime is married to Dore Jean Carroll, a former reporter for the Star Ledger and has three sons, Cole, Owen, and Trevor.

College

DuHaime graduated from Rutgers University in 1995 with a B.A. in Journalism and Political science.  He was also a four-year skater on the Rutgers Ice Hockey team where he served as a captain for championship teams his junior and senior seasons. The team played in the MCHC and did compete at the NCAA level.

Early career

DuHaime started in politics as a volunteer on his father's campaigns for Freeholder and U.S. Senate, and worked as an intern in the New Jersey State Senate Majority office in Trenton.

In 1997, he became the Campaign Manager for Anthony Bucco, a Republican State Assemblyman from Morris County who was challenging an incumbent Democratic State Senator in New Jersey's 25th Legislative District.((fact)) Bucco defeated Peter Mancuso, a former Mayor of Morris Township and a former New Jersey Republican State Committee Finance Chairman, in the Republican primary by a 56%-44% margin. In the General Election, Bucco defeated incumbent State Sen. Gordon MacInnes by a 55%-44% margin. Bucco won despite being heavily outspent in both races, and was the only Republican to defeat an incumbent Democratic State Senator in New Jersey from 1991 to 2007.

As the Vice-President of Political Communications in 1998 for Campbell & Pusateri, a national Republican consulting firm in Alexandria, Virginia, DuHaime designed paid media and mail strategies for races throughout the country, the most noteworthy of which was the open seat congressional race in Pennsylvania's 10th District, where Democrats outnumbered Republicans. DuHaime's client, the businessman Don Sherwood, assembled "a grassroots organization of 1,800 volunteers and propounding an agenda that combined small business to cut taxes" (Almanac of American Politics 2000) and won an eight-candidate field in the Republican primary with 43% of the vote. Scranton Mayor Jim Connors finished second with 23%. In the General Election, Sherwood defeated Patrick Casey, the son of popular former Governor Robert Casey, by 515 votes, 49%-48%.

Recognized for his ability and success Campaigns & Elections Magazine named DuHaime a "Rising Star in American Politics" at the age of 24 in 1998, and he has taught seminars on political communication and grassroots campaigning to candidates and operatives in New Jersey and Washington. DuHaime has also spoken on grassroots politics at Harvard and Rutgers.

In 1999, DuHaime returned to New Jersey to work in the District Office of Rep. Bob Franks, a former Republican State Chairman who was in his fourth term in the U.S. House.  He also served as Executive Director of New Jersey's New Century, a political action committee chaired by Congressman Franks.

2000 campaign

Democratic U.S. Senator Frank R. Lautenberg was retiring after three terms and Republican Governor Christine Todd Whitman was running to succeed him. But in September 1999, Whitman unexpectedly dropped out of the race and four candidates, including Bob Franks, sought the Republican Senate nomination.

DuHaime became Franks' Deputy Campaign Manager. Franks won the Republican nomination after an intensive grass roots campaign, directed by DuHaime, that included several stunning upsets in pre-primary conventions for the endorsements of county organizations. In the general election, Franks lost narrowly to Democrat Jon Corzine, who spent more than $70 million of his own money to win a U.S. Senate seat. A Quinnipiac University Polling Institute poll released the day before the 2000 election showed Franks leading Corzine, 45%-43%.

Political consultant
From 2001 to 2003, DuHaime owned the Hoboken, New Jersey political consulting firm DuHaime Communications, Inc. His clients included Thomas H. Kean, Jr., who won election to his first public office in 2001 as a candidate for the New Jersey General Assembly in a Special Election. DuHaime was also the consultant for Kean's first State Senate race two years later. Another client was Bill Baroni, who unseated an incumbent Democratic Assemblyman in 2003.

DuHaime served as Executive Director of the New Jersey Republican State Committee in 2002. The state party utilized innovative GOTV tactics that resulted in increased turnout in GOP strongholds that, for the first time in years, outpaced the turnout in Democratic areas. Doug Forrester, the Republican candidate for United States Senate that year, was soundly defeated by former United States Senator Frank Lautenberg.

2008 presidential election
DuHaime was originally serving as campaign manager for Rudy Giuliani's presidential campaign. However when Arizona Senator John McCain secured the Republican nomination, DuHaime became the senior advisor for Political Operations at the Republican National Committee. As of July 7, DuHaime was hired as political director for Sen. John McCain's unsuccessful presidential bid.

2009 New Jersey gubernatorial election
DuHaime was the lead consultant for Republican Chris Christie, who was elected Governor of New Jersey in 2009. Christie defeated incumbent Governor Jon S. Corzine by nearly 100,000 votes. Christie named DuHaime as one of ten members of his transition team. DuHaime headed the transition panel for the state's independent authorities, which includes the Port Authority of New York and New Jersey, and the New Jersey Sports and Exposition Authority.

Gubernatorial transition
DuHaime was one of ten members of Gov.-elect Chris Christie's Transition Team and chaired the Authorities Subcommittee, which deals with the state's independent authorities and agencies.

Personal
DuHaime has been a resident of Westfield, New Jersey.

DuHaime teaches a class called "Political Campaigning" at his alma mater, Rutgers University, along with Corzine's reelection campaign manager, Maggie Moran.

Trump impeachment
DuHaim said of Donald Trump's second impeachment “The longer Donald Trump stays central to the news, the better it is for Biden,” he said. “The constant reminder of Trump’s worst actions makes Biden look great by comparison, simply by acting sane.”

See also
List of people involved in the Fort Lee lane closure scandal

References

1974 births
American campaign managers
Living people
New Jersey Republicans
People from Bloomingdale, New Jersey
People from Westfield, New Jersey
Rutgers University alumni